Godega di Sant'Urbano, also known simply as Godega, is a comune (municipality) in the Province of Treviso in the Italian region Veneto, located about  north of Venice and about  northeast of Treviso.

Godega di Sant'Urbano borders the following municipalities: Codogné, Colle Umberto, Cordignano, Gaiarine, Orsago, San Fior.

Twin towns
Godega di Sant'Urbano is twinned with:

  L'Isle-en-Dodon, France, since 2006

References

External links

 Official website

Cities and towns in Veneto